Catacomb Hill is a prominent rock peak,  high, on the ridge that borders the east side of the head of Blue Glacier, in Victoria Land. The New Zealand Blue Glacier Party of the Commonwealth Trans-Antarctic Expedition (1956–58) established a survey station on its summit in December 1957. They gave it this descriptive name from the spectacular cavernous weathering occurring in the granite of the peak, suggestive of catacombs.

See also
Catacomb Ridge

References
 

Mountains of Victoria Land
Scott Coast